Diminutive Folded Linear Series #4 is a painting by Yvonne Pickering Carter. It is in the collection of the Gibbes Museum of Art in Charleston, South Carolina in the United States.

The painting comprises a collection of pieces of paper, folded and sewed together, painted with colorful, abstract watercolor paintings. Carter's signature is located on the bottom right of the painting, reading: Yvonne Pickering Carter '78. The painting is attached to a piece of plexiglas. The painting is part of Carter's Diminutive Folded Linear Series.

Diminutive Folded Linear Series #4 was purchased by the Gibbes Museum of Art in 1978 with funding from the National Endowment for the Arts.

References

1978 paintings
Paintings by Yvonne Pickering Carter
Watercolor paintings